Stretchia muricina is a moth in the family Noctuidae (owlet moths) described by Augustus Radcliffe Grote in 1876. It is found in North America.

The MONA or Hodges number for Stretchia muricina is 10473.

References

Further reading
 
Lafontaine, J. Donald, & Schmidt, B. Christian (2010). "Annotated check list of the Noctuoidea (Insecta, Lepidoptera) of North America north of Mexico". ZooKeys, vol. 40, 1-239.

External links
Butterflies and Moths of North America

Noctuinae